Amir Weintraub (born 16 September 1986) is an Israeli professional tennis player. In 2010, he won the Israeli Tennis Championship.

He achieved a career-high singles ranking of World No. 161 in May 2012.

Career overview
In August 2006 at the age of 19, Weintraub won his first ITF Futures title in Senegal. One year later, he made his first challenger final in Uzbekistan but lost to Denis Istomin.

In December 2009, Weintraub made it to the finals of the Israeli Tennis Championship, losing to Dudi Sela in three sets. In December 2010, he won the Israeli Tennis Championship, winning against Sela 7–6, 3–6, 7–6.

In January 2011 Weintraub participated for the first time in a Grand Slam tournament, the Australian Open, but lost in the first qualifying round. In the same month, it was decided that he would play in the Israeli Davis Cup team as the second singles player in their tie against Poland.

In March 2011 Weintraub won his first Davis Cup match, against Poland's Jerzy Janowicz in 5 sets. On 16 September 2011, he defeated Milos Raonic in four sets to square Israel's Davis Cup tie with Canada at 1–1 but then he lost the decisive tie to Vasek Pospisil, on 18 September.

Weintraub made the finals of the 2012 Fergana Challenger which would push him to his career-high ranking of 161 on May 21, 2012.

In September 2012, Weintraub participated in a Davis Cup tie against the Japan Davis Cup team and won his first match against Tatsuma Ito in straight sets, and won the decisive match against Go Soeda who ranked 170 places above him in four sets. Because of this match Israel qualified for the 2013 Davis Cup World Group after a two-year absence.

Weintraub qualified for singles main draw play at the 2013 Australian Open where he defeated Guido Pella in the first round and lost in the second round to 17th seed Philipp Kohlschreiber.

Weintraub sustained a severe groin injury at the 2014 Davis Cup and was inactive for nine months after he failed to qualify for 2014 Wimbledon. His ranking dropped to a low of 623 in June 2015.

2016 saw a return to form for Weintraub as he surged back into the top 200 in March. He won two more ITF titles within the year.

Weintraub suffered another injury at the beginning of 2017 and was inactive for the rest of 2017, all of 2018, and the first few months of 2019. He dropped out of the ATP rankings in January 2018.

Weintraub returned to tennis by using a protected ranking at the 2019 French Open Qualifying where he lost to 19th seed Lukáš Rosol in the first round. Throughout 2019 he would continuously receive protected ranking spots into the qualifying draws of ATP tournaments which also included a main draw appearance at the 2019 Winston-Salem Open where he was doubles bageled in the first round by qualifier Bjorn Fratangelo.

Weintraub played his last match to date at the 2020 Australian Open qualifying where he lost to Lorenzo Musetti in the first round. He has not played a match since.

ITF & Challenger career finals

Singles: 24 (18–10)

Doubles (15-12)

References

External links

 Amir Weintraub official website
 
 
 

1986 births
Living people
Israeli male tennis players
Jewish tennis players
People from Rehovot
Israeli Jews
Jewish sportspeople